Ricardo da Silva Tavares Pereira (born 14 September 1979) is a Portuguese actor, model and television presenter.

Biography 
Ricardo Pereira was born in Lisbon, Portugal. He spent most of his youth in Sintra Municipality and studied for a degree in psychology at the Lusófona University.

Career

Pereira has worked in many projects, ranging from theatre, to television, to cinema.
He launched his career in the year 2000 with the play A Real Calçada ao Sol, to which he followed the movie Um Homem não é um Gato.

He reached stardom in Portugal in 2002, with television projects such as Saber Amar and Bairro da Fonte.
In 2004, he became the first non-Brazilian protagonist in a Rede Globo soap-opera. With a signed contract with the Brazilian broadcaster Rede Globo Ricardo Pereira bought a house in Rio de Janeiro (known as "wonderful city"), where he moved to with his family. Since then he has integrated the casts of various Rede Globo productions, starring in Como uma Onda and Aquele Beijo, to name a few.

Despite the busy schedule, the actor has continued to work in theatre and cinema. In 2012/2013 he played the lead male role in the play Um Sonho para Dois and, also in 2013, he had a role in the French film Cadences obstinées, directed by Fanny Ardant.

Ricardo Pereira has done some work as a TV presenter as well, both in Portugal and Brazil, namely hosting Episódio Especial (SIC) and Dança na Galera (Domingão do Faustão, Rede Globo). Furthermore, he has been the face of various advertising campaigns in both countries, publicising banks, supermarkets, entertainment chain-stores and other companies.

After the end of Joia Rara (Rede Globo), he temporarily moved back to Lisbon to take part in a SIC production entitled Mar Salgado, which premiered in 2014.

Ricardo has integrated the cast of two projects which have won the International Emmy Award in the Best Soap Opera category: Laços de Sangue (SIC) and Joia Rara (Rede Globo)

The actor is represented by L'Agence in Portugal and by 2Twogether in Brazil.

Personal life
Ricardo Pereira married Francisca Ramalho Perestrelo Pinto Ribeiro in July 2010. The ceremony took place in Igreja da Nossa Senhora da Assunção, in Elvas, and had the attendance of around 400 guests.
The couple has three children. A boy named Vicente, born in November 2011, a girl named Francisca, born in October 2013, and the youngest called Julieta. All children were born in Rio de Janeiro, where they were living at the time, and have dual citizenship.

In July 2022, his wife proposed to remarry him on top of the statue Christ the Redeemer in Rio de Janeiro.

Filmography

Television

Film

Stage

As a Presenter

References

External links 

1979 births
Living people
Male actors from Lisbon
Portuguese male television actors
Portuguese male film actors
Portuguese male models
Portuguese male stage actors
Portuguese television presenters
Portuguese expatriates in Brazil
Male actors from Rio de Janeiro (city)
21st-century Portuguese male actors